Prince Abdul Qawi (Malay: Yang Amat Mulia Tengku Sri Utama Raja Pengiran Muda Abdul Qawi ibni Duli Yang Teramat Mulia Paduka Seri Pengiran Perdana Wazir Sahibul Himmah Wal-Waqar Pengiran Muda Mohamed Bolkiah; born 27 January 1974) is a member of the Brunei Royal Family. He is a nephew of the current Sultan of Brunei, Sultan Hassanal Bolkiah.

Early life and education 
Prince Abdul Qawi was born in Bandar Seri Begawan, Brunei on 27 August 1974 as the second child and eldest son of Paduka Seri Pengiran Perdana Wazir Sahibul Himmah Wal-Waqar Pengiran Muda Mohamed Bolkiah Ibni Almarhum Sultan Haji Omar 'Ali Saifuddien Sa'adul Khairi Waddien and Pengiran Anak Isteri Pengiran Anak Hajah Zariah binti Almarhum Pengiran Pemancha Pengiran Anak Haji Mohamed Alam.

Prince Abdul Qawi received his early education at St. Andrew's School, Bandar Seri Begawan. He continued his higher education at the Paduka Seri Begawan Sultan Science College until he completed his secondary education and passed the GCEO Level. He then went to study at St Andrew’s College, United Kingdom for his GCE A Level and later continued his studies at Queen Mary and Westfield College, University of London, United Kingdom. He obtained the degree of Bachelor of Politics with Business Management.

Career 
Upon graduating, in 1998, Prince Abdul Qawi served Research Officer at the Ministry of Foreign Affairs and Trade, Brunei Darussalam. He resigned in 2000 and ventured into business. His past experience was a member of Baiduri Group and director of Baiduri Bank from 2000 to 2010. He was on the ASEAN Business Advisory Council from 2002 to 2012.

He was formerly the Chairman of The Brunei Hotel. He was also the Non-Executive Chairman at KLW Holdings Limited and Deputy and Executive Chairman of QAF Brunei Sdn. Bhd.

Currently, Prince Muda Abdul Qawi holds the position of Non-Executive Chairman at HS Optimus Holdings Ltd., Chairman for National Insurance Co. Bhd., Chairman at Everon Sdn. Bhd., Chairman of QOS Sdn. Bhd. and Chairman at Supremo Management Services Sdn. Bhd. He is also Member of East-Asia Business Council, Member of Confederation of Asia-Pacific Chambers of Commerce & Industry and Member of Insead East Asia Council.

Personal life

Marriage 
On 27 June 2013, Prince Abdul Qawi married Tengku Amalin A’ishah Putri, the youngest child and only daughter of Sultan Ismail Petra, the 28th Sultan of Kelantan, and Raja Perempuan Tengku Anis at Istana Mahkota in Kota Bharu, Kelantan.

Issue 
From their marriage, the royal couple has four children. On 13 April 2014, the royal couple welcomed their first child, a princess named Pengiran Anak Tengku Afeefah Musyafaah Bolkiah Putri. Their second child, a daughter, Pengiran Anak Tengku Azzahra Iffatul Bolkiah Putri, was born on 24 June 2016. A third child, a daughter named Pengiran Anak Tengku Zaafirah Muizzah Bolkiah Putri was born on 12 February 2020. A fourth child and first son, Pengiran Anak Tengku Abdul Muhaimin was born on 26 June 2022.

Sports 
He had previously played and captained QAF FC in 2007, where they became champions of the 2007–08 Brunei Premier League.

Title 
In 2022, Prince Abdul Qawi was conferred the title of Tengku Sri Utama Raja by his brother-in-law Sultan Muhammad V of Kelantan.

Honour
 :
  Knight Grand Commander of the Order of the Crown of Kelantan (SPMK) - Dato' (2022)

Ancestry

References 

1974 births
Living people
Bruneian Muslims
Bruneian royalty
Bruneian polo players
Southeast Asian Games medalists for Brunei
Southeast Asian Games medalists in polo
Competitors at the 2017 Southeast Asian Games